LG15: The Resistance (September 20, 2008—December 12, 2008) is a web television series produced by EQAL that took place within the LG15 Universe. The series was first announced on July 4, 2008, via the official behind-the-scenes LG15 blog, Inside. It premiered on September 16, 2008, at the New York Television Festival, and was first uploaded for public viewing on September 20, 2008.

The show continued upon the mythology established by lonelygirl15 and KateModern. Two main characters from the lonelygirl15 series, Jonas (Jackson Davis) and Sarah (Alexandra Dreyfus), were also carried over.  Daily content was provided in the form of video blogs, images, text blogs, and other information posted daily from the characters at LG15.com.  On the following Saturday, all of the content from the previous week was compiled into one 6- to 10-minute episode to end that week's "chapter".

LG15: The Resistance also marked the debut of a new LG15.com website. On September 8, 2008, two hundred members of the LG15 community were invited to participate in a private beta of the new website. One week later, on September 15, it was officially released.  The new LG15.com utilizes social networking capabilities such as member profile pages, a new forum, the ability to upload response videos, and the ability to interact with the show's characters and to help solve in-show puzzles.

Each week of the show featured music from a different artist. LG15: The Resistance featured the music of Hyper Crush, Film School, Voxtrot, Push Play, The Teenagers, Voyager One, Scissors For Lefty, Killola, Morningwood, Colourmusic, Illa J, Tokyo Police Club, Celldweller, Castaneda, and Warner Drive.

Plot

"We Will Not Be Stopped"

The show marks the entrance of the Hymn of None, an organization resisting the Order. The Hymn of None posts videos and blogs trying to convince Jonas to join the Resistance as their leader. Jonas does not want to put his life or anyone else's life in danger, however, so he refuses. Jonas's friend Sarah, on the other hand, wants to help the Hymn of None fight the Order and urges the community to help convince Jonas.

The Hymn of None posts a video, exposing a company called LifesBlood Labs to be nothing but a sham to get the blood from Trait Positive girls (like the Order).

After the Hymn of None saves Jonas from a run-in with the FBI, a video is posted by the Hymn of None showing security camera footage of a girl who was kidnapped by LifesBlood Labs. A few days later, Jonas decides he will join the Resistance. The Hymn of None ask him to find the Samsarine Doctrine, a book which supposedly holds secrets about the Trait Positive gene. Jonas follows clues that turn out to be fake, and he ends up getting kidnapped by LifesBlood Labs. A community member named Reed films Jonas's kidnapping. Sarah tracks down the people who kidnapped Jonas, and after spraying mace in the kidnapper's faces, gets Jonas out of the trunk and drives away with him. The Hymn of None posts more security camera footage of the girl, showing her suffering, and her attempted escape.

The Hymn of None posts a puzzle leading Jonas and Sarah to the Samsarine Doctrine. Meanwhile, Reed posts a video stating that he is being followed by LifesBlood Labs. Two days later an agent from LifesBlood Labs shows up at Reed's door. Reed makes a narrow escape, and pleads for Jonas and Sarah to help him. Jonas and Sarah ignore Reed and go to get the book. They successfully obtain it, and escape to safety.

The following week Reed, again, pleads for Jonas and Sarah's help. They decide they will let him join them, and go to Chicago to meet up with him.

The group travel east. The Hymn of None posts footage from Willow Wood Auctioneers, an auction house.  The video is about an item for auction that "is thought to contain a cure for a rare blood condition that has afflicted many young people throughout the ages". The video has a puzzle hidden in it, that contains the date and location of the auction.

Jonas, Sarah, and Reed are leaving a hotel when they have another run-in with the FBI. Reed creates a distraction and the three make it away safely. They continue to travel. Days later, the Hymn of None posts a blog saying that one of their agents will be making an appearance in an online video chat. The agent turns out to be Maggie Schaeffer, the trait positive girl from the security camera footage. Reed posts a blog asking Maggie to join the group, and although she rejects the invitation, a few days later (on Halloween) she shows up at Reed's friend's apartment (where the group is staying).

Jonas, Sarah, Reed, and Maggie finally reach Boston. Sarah goes to the auction by herself only to find an anonymous note telling her that LifesBlood Labs has the cure in LA. The group splits up - Sarah and Reed jet off to LA while Maggie and Jonas stay behind. Once the gang is all in LA, however, Jonas and Sarah get themselves arrested by breaking into the LBL HQ by themselves. Maggie claims she is going to keep her distance, but once Reed gets kidnapped, she snaps back into action. Maggie pulls Jonas and Sarah together, and they rescue Reed.

During the "Day of Atonement", the Finale, the group steals important information from the Hymn of One Center and kidnaps a LifesBlood Labs doctor. They tell the HoO and LBL that they will give these things back in exchange for the cure. Meanwhile, the FBI is on the group's tail and gets involved in the mix. Maggie discovers that Sarah is working for the Order and sends Reed off with an address. Maggie goes to save Jonas but ends up getting kidnapped. Sarah then reveals her intentions to Jonas and a few Order goons drag him off as well. Reed goes to the address Maggie gave him, and it's an old friend - Daniel from lonelygirl15.

Main cast
Jackson Davis as Jonas Wharton
Alexandra Dreyfus as Sarah Genatiempo
Marnette Patterson as Maggie Schaeffer
Brett Ryback as Reed Barnes

See also
EQAL
lonelygirl15

References

External links
LG15.com
LG15: The Resistance Official Website
LGPedia, LG15 Wiki
Inside, Official LG15 Insider Blog
LG15 Today, LG15 Community Blog
 Video interview of Resistance creators by Zadi Diaz of EPIC FU, weekly web show that covers online pop culture (September 23, 2008)

2008 web series debuts
2008 web series endings
American drama web series
2000s YouTube series
Lonelygirl15